China National Highway 213 (G213) runs from Ceke, Inner Mongolia, to Mohan, on the border with Laos, in Yunnan. Before the 2013 Highway Planning, the route started in Lanzhou, Gansu.

This route was a key transportation route into the disaster zone during the 2008 Wenchuan earthquake, and was referred to as a "lifeline" by rescue workers. On 6 July 2011, it was damaged by mudslides and collapses, including a  stretch which was damaged as a result of the nearby river being diverted by a mudslide.

For the extension to Ceke, a tunnel is being constructed on the  pass on the Gansu-Qinghai border near Sunan County.

Route and distance

See also
China National Highways
AH3

References

Transport in Gansu
Transport in Yunnan
Transport in Sichuan
Transport in Kunming
213